Baba Kuseh may refer to:
 Baba Kuseh-ye Olya
 Baba Kuseh-ye Sofla